Hippocampus is a monthly peer-reviewed scientific journal established in 1991. It is published by John Wiley & Sons and covers the neurobiology of the hippocampal formation and related structures. The founding editors-in-chief were David Amaral and Menno Witter, who were succeeded in 1998 by Howard Eichenbaum (Boston University), who remained in this position until he died in 2017.

Abstracting and indexing 
The journal is abstracted and indexed by:

According to the Journal Citation Reports, the journal has a 2020 impact factor of 3.899.

References

External links 

Publications established in 1991
Neuroscience journals
Monthly journals
English-language journals
Limbic system
Wiley (publisher) academic journals